The Mittellegi Hut (German: Mittellegihütte) (3,355 m) is a mountain hut in the Swiss Alps, located on the Mittellegi ridge of the Eiger above Grindelwald. It is the highest mountain hut in the canton of Bern. Its construction was funded by Maki Yūkō, a Japanese climber, in 1924 as a memorial of his world first climb to the Eiger.

See also
List of buildings and structures above 3000 m in Switzerland

References
Swisstopo topographic maps
Maki Yūkō

External links

Mittellegi Hut on Hikr

Mountain huts in Switzerland
Eiger
Mountain huts in the Alps